Silver Dollar Pizza is a pizzeria and sports bar in Portland, Oregon.

Description
Silver Dollar Pizza is a pizzeria and sports bar on 21st Avenue in northwest Portland's Northwest District. In 2019, Alex Frane of Eater Portland described Silver Dollar as "a bar that's just as much about the games on the floor as the games on the TV". The interior features air hockey, darts, fooseball, hoops, pool tables, shuffleboard, table tennis, and video poker. The bar is known for screening Portland Winterhawks games.

History

In 2014, the Oregon Liquor Control Commission temporarily suspended the business' liquor license. In response, Silver Dollar posted a sign on the door which said, "The OLCC has ludicrously decided to punish us ... because we allowed a minor to work in our kitchen."

In 2020, during the COVID-19 pandemic, owner Sam Macbale received a permit for outdoor seating from the Winter Healthy Businesses Program. The patio was covered and lights and plants were added.

In 2021, one person was killed and two more were injured after a shooting at the restaurant.

The business is affiliated with nearby Underdog Sportsbar.

Reception
In 2018, Ben Stone and Tyler Pell of Willamette Week called Silver Dollar the "most high-octane" option for table tennis in Portland

Alex Frane included Silver Dollar in Eater Portland 2019 list of "15 Ideal Portland Sports Bars for Catching the Game", in which he wrote, "The pizza itself isn’t mind-blowing, but slices are reliable, cheap, and good for soaking up some draught beers and cheap well drinks."

See also

 Pizza in Portland, Oregon

References

External links

 
 Silver Dollar Pizza Co at Thrillist
 Silver Dollar Saloon & Pizza at Zomato

Drinking establishments in Oregon
Northwest District, Portland, Oregon
Pizzerias in Portland, Oregon